Anand is a 1987 Indian Tamil-language romantic drama film, directed by C. V. Rajendran for Sivaji Productions. The film stars Prabhu, Radha and Jayashree. A remake of the Telugu film Majnu, it was released on 20 November 1987.

Plot

Cast 
Prabhu as Anand
Radha as Latha
Jayashree as Geetha
Chinni Jayanth
Usilai Mani
Kullamani
Cho Ramaswamy as Anand's father
Sivachandran

Soundtrack 
Soundtrack was composed by Ilaiyaraaja. Lyrics were by Gangai Amaran. Anand was the first Tamil film since the 1950s where Lata Mangeshkar sang; she performed without taking remuneration out of respect for Prabhu's father Sivaji Ganesan.

Reception 
The Indian Express wrote, "As both lovers belong to the upper class, the décor of the interiors is modish. G.OR. Nathan's photography accentuates this effect: the soft and diffuse lighting gives the film a classy texture". Kalki gave the film a more mixed review.

References

External links 
 

1980s Tamil-language films
1987 films
1987 romantic drama films
Films directed by C. V. Rajendran
Films scored by Ilaiyaraaja
Indian romantic drama films
Tamil remakes of Telugu films